Selles-Saint-Denis is a commune in the Loir-et-Cher department of central France.

Geography
The river Rère flows west through the southern part of the commune.

Population

See also
Communes of the Loir-et-Cher department

References

Sellessaintdenis